Dion John Conroy (born 11 December 1995) is an English professional footballer who plays as a defender for  club Crawley Town.

Club career

Chelsea
After a spell with Fulham, Conroy joined Chelsea in 2008 as an Under-13. Conroy quickly progressed through the youth ranks with the Blues and guided Chelsea to FA Youth Cup and Under-21 Premier League victories in 2014. On 29 February 2016, Conroy was rewarded with a new two-year contract until 2018.

On 31 August 2016, Conroy joined National League side Aldershot Town on a six-month loan deal until January 2017. A week later, Conroy made his Aldershot debut in a 1–1 draw against Boreham Wood, featuring for the full 90 minutes. On 22 December 2016, after impressing with Aldershot, Conroy's loan was extended until the end of the 2016–17 campaign. However, just over a month later, Chelsea terminated his loan deal, with many Football League clubs interested in purchasing the defender.

Swindon Town
On 27 January 2017, Conroy joined League One side Swindon Town on a two-and-a-half-year deal. A day later, Conroy made his Swindon debut in a 1–0 away defeat against local rivals Bristol Rovers, replacing Lloyd Jones in the 90th minute. On 11 February 2017, Conroy was given his first start by manager Luke Williams, in Swindon's 1–0 away defeat against Bury, featuring for the entire 90 minutes. On 16 September 2017, Conroy ruptured the anterior cruciate ligament during Swindon's 3–2 victory over Stevenage, ruling him out for several months.

He was offered a new contract by Swindon at the end of the 2018–19 season. In June 2019 he signed a new one-year contract.

Following defeat to Port Vale in the EFL League Two play-offs, Conroy was released at the end of the 2021–22 season.

Crawley Town
On 30 June 2022, it was announced that Conroy had joined EFL League Two club Crawley Town on a two-year contract.

Personal life
Conroy is the younger brother of semi-professional footballer Jay Conroy.

Career statistics

Honours
Swindon Town
EFL League Two: 2019–20

References

1995 births
Living people
English footballers
People from Redhill, Surrey
Footballers from Surrey
Association football defenders
Chelsea F.C. players
Aldershot Town F.C. players
Swindon Town F.C. players
Crawley Town F.C. players
English Football League players
National League (English football) players